Kabatia periclymeni is a species of fungus belonging to the family Dothioraceae.

It is native to Europe and Northern America.

References

Dothideales